The Royal Drawing School is a not-for-profit educational organisation and registered charity in the London Borough of Hackney in England. It was founded in 2000 by King Charles III (then Prince of Wales) and artist Catherine Goodman as The Prince's Drawing School and received its current name in 2014.

The School runs full and part-time drawing courses each year for adults and children of all abilities. This includes a postgraduate programme, The Drawing Year, a Foundation Year, public programme and courses for Young Artists aged 10 – 18 yrs.

It is part of The Prince's Charities, a group of not-for-profit organizations affiliated with Charles. In 2006, The Prince's Drawing School received a donation of £85,000 from The Prince's Charities Foundation.

In 2018, works created by The Royal Drawing School and two other charities founded by King Charles were put on display during the Prince & Patron exhibition to mark his 70th birthday.

Sites and collaborations 
The Royal Drawing School has two campuses across London: in Shoreditch (where it is based in a converted warehouse) and Trinity Buoy Wharf. The School also collaborates with a number of institutions including The National Gallery, The British Museum, Royal Academy of Arts, National Portrait Gallery and the V&A.

Notable alumni
 Claerwen James
 Carl Randall
 Stuart Pearson Wright
 Catherine Story

References

External links
 Royal Drawing School
 The Prince's Charities

Prince's Drawing School
Prince's Drawing School
Education in the London Borough of Hackney
Art schools in London
Educational institutions established in 2000
2000 establishments in England
2000 in London
The Prince's Charities
Arts organizations established in 2000